Shears may refer to:

Cutting devices
 Scissors, also called shears
 Hair-cutting shears
 Blade shears, typically used for shearing animals
 Grass shears, for lawn trimming
 Kitchen shears, scissors used in the kitchen for food preparation
 Pinking shears, scissors where the blades are sawtoothed instead of straight; they leave a zigzag pattern instead of a straight edge
 Pruning shears, for cutting branches and stems
 Snips, for cutting metal
 Trauma shears, scissors used by emergency medical personnel to cut clothing

People
 Albert Shears (born 1900), English footballer
 Augustus Shears (1827–1911), English clergyman
 Curtis Shears (1901–1988), American Olympic fencer
 Ernest Shears (1849–1917), Anglican clergyman in South Africa
 George Shears (1890–1978), Major League Baseball pitcher
 Jake Shears (born 1978), lead vocalist for the American music group Scissor Sisters
 Philip James Shears (1887–1972), British Army officer
 Stevie Shears (born c. 1950), musician known for playing in English rock bands Tiger Lily and Ultravox
 Tara Shears (born 1969), English physicist
 Daniel Towers Shears (1784–1860), English coppersmith and inventor
 James Shears (c1750-1820), English coppersmith
 James Henry Shears (1788–1855), English coppersmith and entrepreneur

In fiction
 Sally Shears (also known as Molly Millions), a recurring character in stories and novels written by William Gibson

Other
 Shears (moth), European moth of the family Noctuidae
 Golden Shears, sheep shearing event

See also
 Shear (disambiguation)